Imaike Station may refer to:
 Imaike Station (Aichi)
 Imaike Station (Fukuoka) 
 Imaike Station (Osaka), a railway station in Japan